Meredith Pardue is an American abstract painter.

Early life and education
Meredith Pardue was born in Monroe, Louisiana November 22, 1975. She earned a B.F.A. in painting with a minor in art history from the Savannah College of Art and Design in 1998, and an M.F.A. in painting from Parsons School of Design in 2003.

Career
Pardue is a contemporary abstract painter, who works in mixed media. Most of her paintings are composed of layers of acrylic, ink, and oil.  During her career Pardue has lived in Austin, Portland, Savannah, New York City, and Louisiana, and has stated that the physical landscapes and local cultures of each city influenced the work she produced while living in each place, as well as her travels along United States coastlines, France, and the Caribbean. Pardue has stated that “paintings are a visual record of an unplanned dialogue between a blank canvas and myself.”  Nature is a significant inspiration in her work.

Her work has been published in art periodicals including the Southern Review, New American Paintings, Elle Decoration, and Architectural Digest. Pardue's work has been exhibited in solo and group exhibitions in the United States, England, Singapore, and France. Galleries that have represented her work include Kathryn Markel Fine Art in New York City, Cube Gallery in London, Laura Rathe Fine Art in Dallas and Houston, Gruen Galleries in Chicago, Ann Connelly Fine Art in Baton Rouge, and Galerie Got in Paris. Her work has also been included in the SCAD Fash Museum. In 2015 a book about her work was published entitled Paint.

Personal life
Meredith Pardue is the mother of two sons and one daughter. Pardue is based in Austin, Texas. She is married to Mike Hewett, a realist painter, and the two produce collaborative work under the name Pardue Hewett.

References

Living people
Savannah College of Art and Design alumni
People from Monroe, Louisiana
21st-century American painters
1975 births